Camera West is a Canadian documentary television series which aired on CBC Television from 1964 to 1967.

Premise
This series of mid-year documentaries was produced in Vancouver and concentrated on life in western Canada and featured varying topics.

Scheduling
The first run of this half-hour series was broadcast on Wednesdays at 8:00 p.m. (Eastern) from 1 July to 16 September 1964. In the following seasons it was seen on Sundays, 10:30 p.m. in the second season (11 July to 12 September 1965), 10:00 p.m. in the third season (3 to 24 July 1966) and finally 5:30 p.m. in its fourth season (16 July to 24 September 1967).

Episodes

1964 season
 "Circles of Power" (Michael Rothery producer; Peter Haworth writer), a two-part series on witchcraft
 "Ghost of Walhachin" (Tom Connachie producer and writer), about a British Columbia settlement
 "The Fountain of Youth" (Doug Gillingham), about a health farm
 "The Good Citizens" (Doug Gillingham producer; Hilda Mortimer writer), a two-part series about Chinese Canadians in the west
 "Shawnigan" (George Robertson writer and director), featuring the private Victoria-area Shawinigan Lake School for boys
 "Strange Gray Day, This" (Maurice Embra producer), featuring poet and artist bill bissett
 "Through the Looking Glass" (Michael Rothery producer; David Gray writer), regarding LSD's clinical use
 "Tricks or Treatment" (Gordon Babineau), about hypnotism
 "Whatever Happened to the Horse?"

1965 season
 "Crystal Prize", about an international ski competition at Crystal Mountain, Washington
 "The Heart of the Thing", about Emily Carr
 "Immigrant Impressions": recent immigrants to Vancouver give their impressions of the city and various aspects of Canadian mores and culture
 "The Last Parade", about Portuguese immigrants in the Okanagan Valley
 "A Matter of Choice" (Stanley Fox producer); on British Columbia's Irish Fusiliers
 "Paul Kane"
 "Shawnigan" (rebroadcast from 1964)
 "The Islanders" (George Robertson producer), about the Gulf Islands

1966 season
 "Carole" (Gene Lawrence producer; Dave Brock writer), about Vancouver School of Art student Carole Thompson
 features on Vancouver's West End
 a documentary on how children have less creative initiative as they grow older
 an episode about the Lusitania's sinking, based on Len Chapple's radio documentary

References

External links
 

CBC Television original programming
1964 Canadian television series debuts
1967 Canadian television series endings